Mérine District is a district of Sidi Bel Abbès Province, Algeria. Its capital is the town of Merine.

Subdivision
Merine
Oued Taourira
Tafissour
Taoudmout

References

Districts of Sidi Bel Abbès Province